Methods to End It All is the debut album by heavy metal band Creation's Tears who are based in Northern Ireland, with some members based in England.  Methods To End It All has been referred to by journalist Malcolm Dome and producer Jens Bogren as belonging to the Gothic metal genre while others have drawn comparisons to Lacuna Coil,  Within Temptation,  Opeth,   Paradise Lost,  My Dying Bride and Anathema.

The band's personnel, fronted by singer / guitarist Brian Eddie Reynolds includes former members of established Heavy metal acts;  Lee Morris ex Paradise Lost and guest female vocalist Sarah Jezebel Deva ex Cradle Of Filth.  Methods To End It All would be the first Heavy Metal Music album to feature Lee Morris since his departure from Paradise Lost in 2004.

In a completely unexpected twist and just days before recording sessions for Methods To End It All commenced, bassist Ian Coulter announced he would be leaving Creation's Tears to concentrate on his new marriage. Coulter did however play bass on the band's Methods To End It All album.

Recording sessions for Methods To End It All commenced in January 2010. Creation's Tears employed three producers for different attributes of the recording. Ex Kill II This member Mark Mynett recorded the drums with Lee Morris in Huddersfield. Producers, Jens Bogren (Opeth, Katatonia, Soilwork, Amon Amarth) and David Castillo (Inme, Eluveitie, Katatonia) recorded all guitars at the famous Fascination Street Studio in Örebro with vocals and bass recorded at Ghost Ward Studios Stockholm where Katatonia recorded Night Is the New Day.

The debut Creation's Tears album Methods To End It All had initially been touted for a Spring 2010 release but following the band's vocalist, Brian Eddie Reynolds contracting serious food poisoning during the recording sessions in Stockholm, the release was subsequently postponed. Reynolds would finish a small vocal section at his home studio in Ballymena.

Sarah Jezebel Deva ex Cradle Of Filth made a guest appearance on Methods To End It All track Creation's Tears.

Methods To End It All was eventually released on 4 October 2010 via Cure For Poison Records and distributed through Code 7 / Plastic Head distribution in UK & Republic of Ireland

Track listing

Credits

Personnel
 Brian Eddie Reynolds – All Vocals & All Guitars
 Ian Coulter – Bass
 Lee Morris – Session Drums
 Sarah Jezebel Deva – Guest vocals on "Creation's Tears"

Liner notes
 Produced by David Castillo with additional production by Jens Bogren & Brian EDDIE Reynolds.
 Mixed & Mastered by Jens Bogren at Fascination Street Studios, Örebro, Sweden, May–July 2010.
 Pre-production by Mark Mynett, Brian EDDIE Reynolds & Ian Coulter.
 Drums recorded & engineered by Mark Mynett at Blue Rooms, Hudders?field, England 15th – 17th Jan 2010.
 All guitars & (Vocals: Creation's Tears, Odyssey, No Saviour Here, I'm Falling) engineered & produced by David Castillo at Fascination Street Studios, Örebro, Sweden 21st Jan – 2nd Feb 2010.
 Sarah Jezebel Deva's vocals recorded & engineered by Daniel Abela, Escape Route Studios, Essex, England 9th Feb 2010.
 Vocals (Another Collision, I Fail, Parody Paradigm, The Last Tear Is Cried For Romance, Untimely Reminder) & all bass engineered & produced by David Castillo at Ghost Ward Studio, Stockholm, Sweden 24th – 29th Mar 2010.
 Additional vocals on "Untimely Reminder" recorded & produced by Brian EDDIE Reynolds at Cure For Poison Studio, County Antrim, Northern Ireland.
 Front cover photo by Abigael Dani
 Additional cover photography by Brian EDDIE Reynolds.
 Album cover layout & design by Jonny Crozet & Laura Yabsley.
 All songs written & arranged by Brian EDDIE Reynolds.
 All lyrics written by Brian EDDIE Reynolds.

References 
 https://web.archive.org/web/20170409134937/http://www.creationstears.com/biography - Creation's Tears Biography
 Big Cheese Magazine Issue 127 / October 2010 page 25 Retrieved 11/11/2010
 Rock Sound Magazine Issue 141 / November 2010 Retrieved 11/11/2010
 Kerrang! Magazine Issue 1334 / October 16, 2010 page 5 Retrieved 10/31/2010
 Kerrang! Magazine Issue 1336 / October 30, 2010 page 13 Retrieved 10/31/2010
 Terrorizer Magazine Issue 203 / Nov 2010 page 94 Retrieved 11/11/2010
 Metal Hammer Magazine UK Issue Nov 2010 page 127 Retrieved 11/11/2010
 https://web.archive.org/web/20100902185724/http://www.roadrunnerrecords.com/blabbermouth.net/news.aspx?mode=Article&newsitemID=145212 - Blabbermouth.net CREATION'S TEARS Debut To See Light Of Day In October - Aug. 27, 2010
 https://web.archive.org/web/20101205044803/http://www.roadrunnerrecords.com/blabbermouth.net/news.aspx?mode=Article&newsitemID=146633 - Blabbermouth.net SARAH JEZEBEL DEVA To Guest On CREATION'S TEARS Album - Sep. 24, 2010
  - Blabbermouth.net CREATION'S TEARS: Behind-The-Scenes Footage From The Studio - Oct. 19, 2010
 http://www.bravewords.com/news/148847 - Bravewords.com CREATION'S TEARS - Making Of Video Footage For Methods To End It All Album Available
  - Blabbermouth feature
  - Creation's Tears frontman food poisoning
 https://web.archive.org/web/20110101183513/http://www.metalireland.com/2010/11/07/creations-tears-methods-to-end-it-all/ - Review of Methods To End It All by Ciaran Tracey (aka Earl Gray) on Metalireland
 https://web.archive.org/web/20101116123855/http://www.classicrockmagazine.com/news/classic-rocks-new-releases-round-up-20/ - Review of Methods To End It All by Malcolm Dome Retrieved 11/13/2010
 Rock Sound Magazine Issue 143 / January 2011 Retrieved 12/25/2010 Review of Methods To End It All by Giles Moorhouse
 http://www.metalstorm.net/pub/review.php?review_id=8673 Review of Methods To End It All by Metalstorm.net
 Powerplay Rock & Metal Magazine Issue 128 page 28 / February 2011 Retrieved 01/28/2011 BEG, BORROW OR STEAL...this month's hottest new releases at a glance!
 Powerplay Rock & Metal Magazine Issue 128 page 43 / February 2011 Retrieved 01/28/2011 Review of Methods To End It All by Ross Barker
 KERRANG! Magazine Issue 1350 page 51 / 12 February 2011 Retrieved 02/10/2011 Review of Methods To End It All by Steve Beebee
 Metal Hammer (UK) Magazine March 2011 Issue page 81 Retrieved 02/10/2011 Review of Methods To End It All by Natasha Scharf
 Terrorizer (UK) Magazine March 2011 Issue 207 (Dominion Mag issue 9 page 18) Review of Methods To End It All by Joy Lasher
 Legacy(Germany) Magazine Issue 71 page 45 Retrieved 03/07/2011 Retrieved 03/07/2011 Review of Methods To End It All by Dirk Zimmermann
 http://www.seaoftranquility.org/reviews.php?op=showcontent&id=10456/ - Review of Methods To End It All by Brian Block on seaoftranquility.org

2010 debut albums
Creation's Tears albums
Albums produced by Jens Bogren